Macoura Diabaté (born 21 March 1986) is a Malian retired footballer who played as a defender. She has been a member of the Mali women's national team.

Club career
Diabaté has played for FC Amazones in Mali and for Domont, Saint-Denis and Metz ESAP in France.

International career
Diabaté capped for Mali at senior level during the 2006 African Women's Championship.

References

1986 births
Living people
Sportspeople from Bamako
Malian women's footballers
Women's association football defenders
Mali women's international footballers
Malian expatriate footballers
Malian expatriate sportspeople in France
Expatriate women's footballers in France
21st-century Malian people